The National Land Company was founded in the United Kingdom in 1845 by Feargus O'Connor to help working-class people satisfy the landholding requirement to gain a vote in county seats.

Events of 1845

April
 Chartist conference approved Feargus O'Connor's plan.

Events of 1846

January
 A set of rules for a friendly society were submitted for approval and rejected.

March
 14 March Heronsgate -  of land were bought.

April
 20 April Heronsgate - The plots were allocated by ballot.

July
 A second set of rules for a friendly society were submitted for approval and rejected.

August
 1 August Lowbands - The plots were allocated by ballot.
 17 August Heronsgate - An exhibition day was held, starting with a march from the west-end of Oxford Street (now Marble Arch).

October
 24 October - The company was provisionally registered as a joint stock company, the Chartist Cooperative Land Company.
 27 October Lowbands -  of land were bought.

December
 17 December - The company was renamed to the National Cooperative Land Company, still on a provisional basis.

Events of 1847

February
The purchase was never completed.

May
 1 May Heronsgate - The allotees moved in (Location Day).
 28 May Lowbands - A visiting day was held.

June
 5 June Snigs End -  of land were bought.
 24 June Minster Lovell -  of land were bought.

August
 9 August - O’Connor ran for parliament again and won the Nottingham seat.
 16 August Lowbands - The allotees moved in (Location Day).
 21 August Minster Lovell - Construction began.

October
 Snigs End - The purchase was completed.

Events of 1848

January
 Great Dodford -  of land were bought.
 10 January Snigs End - A procession was held through Cheltenham.

February
 Attempts to gather signatures of shareholders for company registration were abandoned.

April
 Parliament was petitioned to have the NLC registered as a friendly society.

May
 24 May - House of Commons established a Select committee to look into the NLC.

June
 9 June - First sitting of the Select Committee.
 12 June Lowbands - A second visiting day was held.
 12 June Snigs End - The allotees moved in (Location Day).
 12 June - scheduled date for the second reading of O'Connor's bill to legalise the NLC.
 21 June - Second sitting of the Select Committee.
 30 June - Third sitting of the Select Committee.

July
 Great Dodford - NLC Conference
 14 July - Fourth sitting of the Select Committee.
 28 July - Fifth sitting of the Select Committee.
 31 July - The Select Committee reported to the House of Commons.

August
 1 August - Select Committee final report published.

September
 Lowbands - First rents demanded, all the tenants declared themselves incapable of paying.

November
 NLC Conference

Events of 1849

February
 8 February Great Dodford - Three families were reported as applying for parish relief.

March
 1 March Minster Lovell - Tenants petitioned Parliament that they had been promised freehold to their plots.

May
 12 May Great Dodford - Originally scheduled Location Day.

July
 2 July Great Dodford - The allotees moved in (Location Day).
 Parliament voted on and rejected the petition.

October
 Minster Lovell - Mortgage payment due in Sept was missed. Mortgage holders (on discovering that the mortgage fell due in 1848, not 1854 as thought) sued for repossession. Tenants were given to November 1850 to move out.

Events of 1850

April
 15 April Great Dodford - O'Connor put the estate up for auction. Only three lots sold at the auction, and another three by private contract later.

August
 Snigs End - O'Connor sent in bailiffs demanding rent or ejection.

November
 Minster Lovell - Deadline for tenants to move out.

Events of 1851

July
 Parliament passed an act to wind-up the company and pass all its affairs to the Court of Chancery.

Events of 1852

November
 4 November - General Election - O'Connor did not stand for re-election having already been committed for insanity.

Events of 1855

August
 30 August - O'Connor died.

Events of 1857

May
 21 May Snigs End - estate mostly sold by auction.
 27 May Heronsgate was auctioned at the Swan Inn, Rickmansworth.

Events of 1858

June
 2 June Lowbands was auctioned.

References

Chartism